Liberty-Eylau may refer to:
Liberty-Eylau Independent School District
Liberty-Eylau High School
Eylau, Texas